KSF may refer to:

 Kassel Airport, IATA code
 Key success factor
 Kjøbenhavns Skøjteløberforening
 Kosovo Security Force
 Potassium fluorosilicate, specifically when referring to phosphors
 KSF Clan, a Counter-Strike: Source surf clan